Coelogynoporidae is a family of flatworms belonging to the order Proseriata.

Genera

Genera:
 Carenscoilia Sopott, 1972
 Cirrifera Sopott, 1972
 Coelogynopora Steinböck, 1924

References

Platyhelminthes